The Providence Cedars-Sinai Tarzana Medical Center is a hospital in Tarzana, California.  The hospital's ownership changed in July 2008 when Tenet Healthcare sold it to the current owner, Providence Health & Services.  Previously, the hospital was one of the campuses of the Encino-Tarzana Regional Medical Center.

References

External links
Providence Tarzana Medical Center official website

Hospital buildings completed in 2008
Hospitals in the San Fernando Valley
Tarzana
Hospitals in Los Angeles
Tarzana, Los Angeles
2008 establishments in California